Banff may refer to:

Canada
 Banff, Alberta, a town in Alberta, Canada
 Banff Airport
 Banff station
 Banff National Park
 Banff Centre for Arts and Creativity
 Banff (provincial electoral district)
 Banff-Cochrane, another provincial electoral district
 Banff Formation, a stratigraphical unit of the Western Canadian Sedimentary Basin

United Kingdom
 Banff, Aberdeenshire, former royal burgh in Aberdeenshire (formerly Banffshire), Scotland
 Banff distillery, a distiller of malt whisky
 Banffshire (County of Banff) a traditional county
 Banffshire (UK Parliament constituency)
 Banff and Buchan, a modern committee area in Aberdeenshire 
 Lord Banff, title in the Peerage of Scotland
 Banff railway station (Scotland), a former (now closed) railway station
 Banff Bay, a coastal embayment in Scotland

See also
 Banff Trail, Calgary, a neighbourhood of Calgary, Alberta, Canada

 Bamff, Perthshire, Scotland
 BAMF (disambiguation)